Agony (formerly titled The Executrix) is a 2020 American thriller film directed by Michele Civetta and starring Asia Argento, Jonathan Caouette, Monica Guerritore, Ninetto Davoli, Franco Nero and Rade Šerbedžija.

Cast
Asia Argento
Jonathan Caouette
Nick Daly
Ninetto Davoli
Giulia Di Quilio
Monica Guerritore
Molly Jane McCarthy
Franco Nero
Rade Šerbedžija
Simone Wasserman

Release
The film was released on demand on April 3, 2020.

Reception
Lorry Kikta of Film Threat gave the film an 8 out of 10.

References

External links
 
 

American thriller films
2020 thriller films
2020s English-language films
Films directed by Michele Civetta
2020s American films